The Sonaca Group is a Belgian aerospace company. It has subsidiaries in the United States, Canada, Mexico, Brazil, China, Romania and Sri Lanka. In 2018, the Sonaca Group's operating revenues amounted to $900 million. The Sonaca Group currently employs 4,630 workers. 92.604% of the company is owned by SRIW S.A. (French: Société Régionale d'Investissement de Wallonie), 7.393% is owned by SFPI S.A. (French: Société Fédérale de Participations et d'Investissement) and 0.003% is owned by SABCA S.A.

The primary activities of the Sonaca Group are the design and construction of the movable elements of wings (slats and flaps), as well as complex structural components for civil and military aircraft. In addition, the Sonaca Group has continuously developed its design and construction activities in space structures.

History

SEGA
Sonaca is an heir of the Belgian company Avions Fairey, but before that was SEGA (French: Société Générale d'Entreprises Aéronautiques). SEGA was created on 25 June 1920, witnessed by the notary Maillard, by a group of local notables: Fernand Loescher, Victor Dupuis, Alphonse and Désiré Jaumin, André Gobbe, Marius Loiselet and Arille Carlier.

The first activity developed by SEGA was a flying school launched by Commander Fernand Jacquet, a 7-victory WWI-ace and a leading figure in military aviation, a position from which he resigned in January 1921. In July 1921, Jacquet obtained a major contract for the training of military pilots, which for nearly ten years was the primary activity of SEGA. The company gradually acquired all the land that constituted the embryo of what is now the Gosselies aerodrome. In the 1920s, SEGA carried out repairs, produced under license 5 AVIA BH-21, as well as prototypes of the HB-1 based on plans by Henri Bulté.

Avions Fairey
In 1931, when Belgium bought 43 Fairey Firefly IIM, the contract stipulated that part of the equipment (33) had to be manufactured in Belgium. Faced with SABCA's refusal to produce these licensed aircraft, Fairey UK (Hayes) decided to create a subsidiary under the direction of Ernest-Oscar Tips, Société Belge des Avions Fairey, using SEGA's aerodrome, facilities, and qualified staff. During the first 8 years of activity, the company produced 250 aircraft.

Then, Avions Fairey produced the Fairey Fox, a light bomber derived from the Firefly. The Tipsy range of light aircraft was developed and built at Fairey factories under the impetus of Ernest O.Tips. Another development of Fairey factories was the "Phantom", an improved version of the Firefly. This biplane was known for its elegant lines but was technologically outdated. It was not commercially successful.

In order to urgently rearm military aeronautics at the dawn of the Second World War, in parallel with the order for the British-made Hawker Hurricane Mk1, an order for 80 aircraft to be manufactured in Belgium was placed. Only two planes could still be delivered before the conflict broke out. At dawn on May 10, 1940, the factory was seriously damaged by a German bombardment. SEGA was inactive until 1946, when the maintenance activity of the Belgian Air Force aircraft and some civil aviation administration aircraft resumed.

From 1950 onwards, the factory began to produce the Meteor F.8 for the Belgian and Dutch air forces. From 1953 to 1958, it then produced the fuselages of the Hawker Hunters of the same air forces. In 1957, it manufactured the Tipsy Nipper, a cheap single-engine single-seater equipped with a 25 HP VW motor. From 1957 to 1963, SEGA carried out the maintenance of the Belgian Air Force's F-84F.
When six European countries chose to acquire F-104G combat planes, "Avions Fairey" and SABCA joined forces to produce them. The Belgian F-104G were produced between January 1962 and June 1965. Between 1964 and 1971, "Avions Fairey" also carried out some maintenance work on the Luftwaffe's F-104G aircraft.

From May 1960, on the basis of instructions from the British government to rationalise its aeronautical industry, Fairey UK had completely divested itself of the sector by selling its own aeronautical activities to Westland. In 1968, SEGA was incorporated into the capital of Fairey S.A. In 1972, the English company "Fairey Aviation" bought Britten-Norman, which was virtually bankrupt despite its interesting twin-engine BN-2 Islander utility plane. The idea was to boost sales and production at the Gosselies plant, which was sorely lacking in a work plan. Initially, the Islander was manufactured in Romania and completed in Gosselies, where they then produced entirely, including the Trislander development. The Belgian army acquired 12 Islanders in 1976.

Sonaca
The UK subsidiary had financial difficulties, which led to its liquidation on 11 October 1977 and which spread to its Belgian subsidiary. However, Belgium had chosen the F-16 as its multi-role aircraft, and its industry was already well-engaged in a multinational partnership (Netherlands, Belgium, Denmark, Norway) for the production of the F-16 in Europe. The Belgian government decides to buy the company to ensure the sustainability of its participation in this contract. Thus, Avions Fairey, whose activity had never been interrupted after its request for a composition on 30 September 1977, officially took over under the name of Sonaca - an acronym for “Société Nationale de Construction Aérospatiale” - as from 1 June 1978. In this major contract, Sonaca manufactured the rear fuselage and assembled the F16.

Sonaca Group
From the 2000s onward, Sonaca has begun its expansion as the Sonaca Group.

In the 2000s, Sonaca opened a subsidiary near Embraer in Brazil called Sobraer. It is located in São José dos Campos and mainly manufactures fuselage parts. Since 2004, two more factories have been involved in supplying small aircraft parts, PESOLA and SOPECAERO. All Brazilian subsidiaries are currently in the process of merging into Sonaca Brasil.

In 2007, Sonaca's Canadian subsidiary received support from the Government of Montreal to invest $17 million in the expansion of its aircraft wing manufacturing and assembly plant. In December 2017, Sonaca's Canadian subsidiary acquired a giant CNC machine for $7.5 million to manufacture giant parts at very high speeds.

In 2010, Sonaca acquired a subsidiary in China, Sinelson. Later, in 2016, it will obtain another Romania, Sonaca Transilvania.

On September 16, 2015, Sonaca created a new subsidiary, Sonaca Aircraft, to develop a new two-seater training and leisure aircraft. On June 19, 2017, Sonaca made the first test flight of the Sonaca 200, a prototype two-seater training aircraft scheduled to go into production in the fall. It is the first Belgian-made aircraft since the Tipsy Nipper produced between 1957 and 1961. Sonaca Aircraft will present the final version of the Sonaca 200 in April 2018 at the Friedrichshafen Air Show. One year later, the company will present the Sonaca 200 Trainer pro at the same show. Its assembly site is located on the edge of the Namur-Suarlee Airfield in Temploux.

In 2017, Sonaca acquired LMI Aerospace for €405.5 million. LMI Aerospace employs 2,856 people in three countries: the United States, Mexico and Sri Lanka. The company, although integrated, will continue to be called LMI Aerospace. In addition, it will maintain its headquarters in Missouri.

Production

Military
Between 1979 and 1991, Sonaca assembled 160 F-16 for Belgium and 60 for Denmark. As part of the F-16 program, Sonaca is a supplier to Lockheed Martin for the latest versions of the F-16. A total of 1389 rear fuselages (Aft Fuselage) were delivered, and 222 complete structures (Airframe) were integrated. In the military field, Sonaca is involved in the following projects:
A400M:
Leading edge of wings and their associated anti-icing system
Main doors of the landing-gear 
Main structures connecting to engine nacelles.
B-Hunter: Belgian variant of the Hunter unmanned aerial vehicle (UAV) developed with IAI since 1998, and in service in the Belgian army.

Civil
In the civil sector, Sonaca is involved in the following projects:
Airbus
All mobile leading edges and their rails, for all Airbus from the A310 to the latest A350, have been developed and produced by Sonaca as a single source. 
Airbus A380: in addition, "Nose Upper Shell" fuselage structure
Embraer 
Embraer ERJ 135/140/145 and Legacy
Complete sections of central and aft fuselage
Engine mounting pylons
Fixed leading edge wings and associated anti-icing system (development, certification and production).
Embraer 170/190 E1 & E2 jets 
Mobile leading edge wings, their actuators and anti-ice system
All central fuselage panels, Keel beam
Trailing edge flaps
Embraer 175/195 E1 et E2 jets  
E1:  Wing slats, wing slats mechanisms
E2: Wing slats, wing slat mechanisms, wing flap mechanisms, flap track fairing
Dassault Aviation's Falcon 7X and Falcon 8X
Fixed and mobile wing leading edges
The company also collaborates with Boeing on various projects

Space
In the space sector, Sonaca's core activity is the development and construction of flight structures, both metallic and composite, including satellite platforms and instruments. Sonaca has been involved in numerous projects over the past 30 years, including: the European shuttle Hermes, Atmospheric Re-entry demonstrator (ARD), GSTP, FESTIP, Crew Rescue Vehicle (CRV-X38), SPOT5, ISS Columbus, Mars Beagle 2, Aladin-Aeolus, Corot, Pléiades, MUSIS, MPCV Tank Bulkhead, MWI and ICI instruments from MetOp SG.

Activity sites
Belgium:
Sonaca HQ: head office of the Sonaca group, which develops, manufactures and assembles advanced structures for the civil, military and space markets.
Sonaca Aircraft: Light aircraft manufacturing
Brazil (Sonaca Brasil):
Sobraer: Assembly and finishing for Embraer and Airbus
Sopeçaero : Production of sheet metal parts
Pesola: machining
Canada:
Sonaca Montreal: machining and forming of wing panels
China:
Sinelson: assembly of the leading edges of Airbus A320s assembled on Airbus' final assembly line (FALC) in Tianjin.Closed following coronavirus crisis. 
Romania:
Sonaca Transilvania based in Cluj-Napoca: composite parts manufacturing and assembly 
USA
Machining: Aluminum small and medium machining parts, hard metal machining
Forming: Large and small sheets
Composite: Hand-lay-up, thermoplastic
Assembly: Manual and automated, electro-mechanical
Space
Services
Sri Lanka
Services 
Mexico
Forming: small sheet

References

 Pierre Taquet, "De la SEGA et Fairey à SONACA, 100 ans de passion aéronautique à Charleroi", in Charleroi 1666-2016: 350 d'histoire des hommes, des techniques et des idées(Actes de colloque, Charleroi, 23 et 24 septembre 2016), Bruxelles, Académie royale de Belgique, coll. "Mémoires de la Classe des Lettres", 2016, 416p., pp. 177–196
Pierre Sonveaux, Pierre Taquet, "Sonaca 80 ans de passion aéronautique", Snel, Belgique, Septembre 2011, 143 p.

External links
 Official website
 Sonaca Aircraft Website
 The Belgian Aircraft Association
 Annual report 2012
 Annual report 2013
 Annual report 2014
 Annual report 2015
 Annual report 2016
 Annual report 2017
 Annual report 2018

Aircraft manufacturers of Belgium
Companies based in Brussels